Cinnamodendron occhionianum is a species of flowering plant in the family Canellaceae. It is found in the state of São Paulo in Brazil.

References 
	

occhionianum